Argyllshire was a county constituency of the House of Commons of the Parliament of Great Britain from 1708 to 1800 and of the House of Commons of the Parliament of the United Kingdom from 1801 until 1983. The constituency was named Argyll from 1950. The constituency was replaced in 1983 with Argyll and Bute.

It elected one Member of Parliament (MP) using the first-past-the-post voting system.

Creation
The British parliamentary constituency was created in 1708 following the Acts of Union 1707 and replaced the former Parliament of Scotland shire constituency of Argyllshire .

Local government areas

Until Scottish counties were abolished, for most purposes, in 1975, the constituency represented the county of Argyll, except that constituency boundaries may not have coincided at all times with county boundaries, and any parliamentary burgh within the county would have been outside the constituency.

In 1975 most of the county plus the Isle of Bute became the Argyll district of the Strathclyde region. A northern area of the county became part of the Highland region. Until 1975 the Isle of Bute had been part of the county of Bute.

In 1996, 13 years after the abolition of the Argyll constituency and creation of the Argyll and Bute constituency, the Argyll district, plus a portion of the Dumbarton district of Strathclyde, became the Argyll and Bute unitary council area.

Members of Parliament

Argyllshire

Argyll

Election results

Elections in the 1830s

Elections in the 1840s

Campbell resigned by accepting the office of Steward of the Chiltern Hundreds, causing a by-election.

Elections in the 1850s
McNeill resigned after being appointed a Senator of the College of Justice, becoming Lord Colonsay and causing a by-election.

Back to Election results

Elections in the 1860s

Finlay resigned, causing a by-election.

Back to Election results

Elections in the 1870s

Campbell resigned after being appointed Governor General of Canada.

Back to Election results

Elections in the 1880s

Back to Election results

Elections in the 1890s

Back to Election results

Elections in the 1900s

Back to Election results

Elections in the 1910s

General Election 1914–15:

Another General Election was required to take place before the end of 1915. The political parties had been making preparations for an election to take place and by the July 1914, the following candidates had been selected; 
Liberal: 
Unionist: George Hutchison

Back to Election results

Elections in the 1920s

Back to Election results

Elections in the 1930s

Back to Election results

Elections in the 1940s

Back to Election results

Elections in the 1950s

Back to Election results

Elections in the 1960s

Back to Election results

Elections in the 1970s

Back to Top

See also 
 1920 Argyll by-election

References

Argyllshire
Politics of Argyll and Bute
Historic parliamentary constituencies in Scotland (Westminster)
Constituencies of the Parliament of the United Kingdom established in 1708
Constituencies of the Parliament of the United Kingdom disestablished in 1983
Highland constituencies, UK Parliament (historic)